Saint Ampelus (died 302) is a martyr venerated by the Eastern Orthodox and Roman Catholic churches on Nov. 20. He was killed by Romans with his companion, Gaius, during the reign of Diocletian.

Notes

302 deaths
4th-century Christian martyrs
Year of birth unknown